Fert may refer to:

Albert Fert, a French physicist who enabled a breakthrough in gigabyte hard disk drives.
FERT, the motto of the former Italian Royal House of Savoy
Dahir
The long name of the Cyrillic letter Ef
 A very weak opening bid in the game of contract bridge (short for fertiliser), used in strong pass systems; see Glossary of contract bridge terms#fert